Kearney is a town and municipality in the Almaguin Highlands region of Parry Sound District of Ontario, Canada. With a landmass of 528 square kilometres and a year-round population of 974 in the Canada 2021 Census, Kearney claims to be the "Biggest Little Town in Ontario."

History

Perry Township was opened to settlement in 1873 and the first two Post Offices in the township were established at Scotia and Emsdale, on the Muskoka Road. In 1879, in the north-east corner of the township, settlers Arthur J. O'Neil and his partner William Kearney opened a store on the 12th Concession, near what is now Cherry Hill Road, (west of Beaver Lake). In the following year a post office was opened in "Kearney Store" and inherited the name. In those days the closest railway was the Northern at Gravenhurst from which all supplies were brought up the Muskoka Road.

Kearney prospered as a logging town with many sawmills and lumber camps. The logs were floated down the Magnetawan River, some as far as Byng Inlet.

With the arrival of the Ottawa, Arnprior and Parry Sound Railway in 1895, a siding was built at the foot of what was known as Long Lake (now Perry Lake). The commerce of the village shifted to the east side of the lake, near the railway station, where logs would be loaded onto the train after only a few days drive. In 1908, Kearney separated from the township of Perry, and it was incorporated as a town. The original parcel of land included 600 acres (2.4 km²).

The Ottawa, Arnprior and Parry Sound Railway was absorbed into the Canada Atlantic Railway, which was sold to the Grand Trunk Railway in 1905. In 1923 the Grand Trunk became part of the Canadian National Railways. The track from Kearney into Algonquin Park was abandoned in 1959. The rail bed was converted into a road to allow continued access to the now ghost towns of Ryan and Ravensworth, and Rain Lake in Algonquin Park. Sections of the original frontier roads around Ryan and Ravensworth now serve as snow-mobile trails, while others have been completely abandoned and allowed to grow wild.

Through the 1970s Kearney claimed to be "The Smallest Town in Ontario." On December 1, 1979, legislation was passed to amalgamate the town of Kearney, with the geographic townships of Proudfoot and Bethune, as well as the portions of Butt and McCraney townships in Nipissing District that were not part of Algonquin Provincial Park.

In the mid 90s, a town councillor and Kearney Youth Group founder, Dale Louise Germaney, coined the name "Ontario's 'Biggest Little Town'" which is still used to this day.

Community
Kearney is a gateway to Algonquin Park wilderness with three access points - one at Tim Lake, one at Magnetawan Lake and most popular, at Rain Lake. Both canoe and hiking routes can be accessed from these park entry points. In the early years, the train took visitors right into the park, with many side trips available from there. Today the roads run right back into the park's three access points. Kearney is well known as a tourist centre, and has a seasonal population of over 2500 people. Kearney's popularity is not only because of its proximity to Algonquin Park, but for its swimming, water sports, camping and fishing. Lakes within the town boundaries, including Clam, Beaver, Fisher, Grass, Island, Loon and Sand Lakes, are vacation destinations for many visitors - boasting cottages, resorts, and campgrounds. Bear, moose and deer hunting provides sport for hunters coming to the area.

The Kearney Community Centre, which celebrated its 10th anniversary in 2000, houses the municipal offices, library, and seniors room and banquet facilities. The centre offers indoor activities during the weekdays such as card parties and special interest classes. Kearney also has a number of groups including the Royal Canadian Legion, the Lions Club, and various church and other groups.

Events

Annual events include the Blackfly Festival, Lions Club Lobsterfest, Creative Changes Art Show, Sand Lake Regatta, Kearney Regatta, Kearney Lions Club Pancake Breakfast, Christmas Fun Fair and Craft Sale, the "Kearney Dog Sled Races", and Sand Lake Thanksgiving Sunday Turkey Shoot. Kearney is also well known for its grand and impressive firework show that is held every July. Visits can be made to the restored pioneer log church at Sand Lake as well as many other points of interest along the way.

Kearney's history of logging also helped create the trails for their dog sled races in the winter. The races, which are organized by the Kearney Dog Sled Race Committee, have grown in popularity with both spectators and racers since its inception in 1995. The mushers can choose from a number of scenic trails used for four, six, and forty mile races, and as of February 2010, a 120-mile overnight race. In addition to the races, the weekend has a full roster of family events, including cross-country skiing and ice fishing.

The local postal code of Kearney is P0A 1M0. The post office services the town with lock boxes and a rural route. Kearney is located 43 km north of Huntsville, Ontario. From Huntsville, follow Hwy 11 north until exit 244 (Emsdale), then Hwy 518 east to Kearney.

Demographics

Age Groups
 0–14 years: 8.5%
 15–64 years: 62.1%
 65 years and over: 28.2%

Mother Tongue
 English: 92.6%
 French: 2.3%
 Other: 5.1%

Notable people
 Jim Proudfoot (1933– 2001), Canadian sports journalist

Image gallery

See also
Sand Lake (Kearney, Ontario)
Perry Lake (Kearney, Ontario)
List of townships in Ontario

References

Further reading

External links

Logging communities in Canada
Municipalities in Parry Sound District
Single-tier municipalities in Ontario
Towns in Ontario